Ardrossan Academy is a Scottish secondary school, opened in October 1882, serving Ardrossan, with pupils also coming from nearby Saltcoats, West Kilbride, Seamill, Fairlie, Largs and other areas.

Notable alumni

 June Andrews, nursing expert, director of NHS Scotland Centre for Change and Innovation, professor of dementia studies at University of Stirling
 Tom Black, cricketer
 Peter Duncan, MP, chairman of the Scottish Conservative Party
 Sir William Barr McKinnon Duncan, chief executive of Rolls-Royce
 Janice Galloway, writer (The Trick is to Keep Breathing, etc)
 William Hilton, MP, trade unionist, director general of the Federation of Master Builders
 Roy Howat, internationally renowned French music scholar and performer
 Gordon Jackson QC, former MSP, lawyer
 Edith MacArthur, actress
 Iain McNicol, General Secretary, Labour Party

Notable staff
 John Watt Butters (1863–1946), noted mathematician, was Rector 1899–1928
 John Aitkenhead, teacher, co-founder of Kilquhanity School
 Morag Aitkenhead (Robina Roy MacKinnon), teacher, co-founder of Kilquhanity School

References

External links
 
 Former official website (still useful for its archives)

Secondary schools in North Ayrshire
Educational institutions established in 1882
1882 establishments in Scotland
Ardrossan−Saltcoats−Stevenston